PS Karlsruhe Lions is a German professional basketball team located in Karlsruhe. The team competes in Germany's ProA league, the country's second division. In 2017, the team promoted from the third tier ProB to the second tier. The team is part of the multi-sports club Post Südstadt Karlsruhe (PSK).

Arenas
Until 2017, the club played in the Friedrich-List-Schule, which had a capacity of 862 people. In the 2017–18 season, following the club's promotion to the ProA, the Lions started playing in the Europahalle Karlsruhe which has a capacity of 1,500 people. In 2020, they moved to the Lina-Radke-Halle. (1,500 seats)

Players

Current roster

Season by season

Notable former players

Head coaches
  Michael Mai: (2017-2018)
  Ivan Rudez: (2018–2020)
  Drazan Salavarda: (2020–21)
  Aleksandar Scepanovic: (2021–present)

References

External links
Presentation at league website

 
Basketball teams established in 1961
Sport in Karlsruhe